Andrea Ehrig ( Mitscherlich, also known as Schöne, born 1 December 1960) is a retired East German speed skater. She was one of the world's best long-distance skaters in the 1980s. A four-time Olympian, she won seven Olympic medals, including gold in the 3000 metres (as Andrea Schöne) at the 1984 Sarajevo Games.

Career
Ehrig was born Andrea Mitscherlich in Dresden, Saxony, East Germany. At the 1976 Olympics in Innsbruck, as a 15-year-old, she won a silver medal in the 3000 m event, just one one-hundredth of a second ahead of Lisbeth Korsmo who won bronze. At the 1980 Olympics in Lake Placid she came fourth in the 3000 metres. Four years later at the 1984 Olympics in Sarajevo, competing under her first married name of Schöne, she won silver in both the 1000 and the 1500 m and became Olympic champion in the 3000 metres. In 1988, at her fourth and final Olympic Games in Calgary, competing as Andrea Ehrig, she won two more silver medals in the long distances, and a bronze medal in the 1500 metres. She became European champion five times and World Champion twice, in 1983 and 1985. Between 1983 and 1987 she set 10 world records in 1500–10,000 m events.

Ehrig was married twice. After the 1980 Winter Olympics, she married the rower Ingolf Schöne and towards the end of that year, it was announced that she was expecting their child. She married a second time in 1985 to fellow Olympic speed skater Andreas Ehrig.

Personal bests:
500 m – 40.71 (1988)
 1000 m – 1:19.32 (1988)
 1500 m – 2:01.00 (1986)
 3000 m – 4:12.09 (1988)
 5000 m – 7:17.12 (1988)

References

External links

 Andrea Mitscherlich at SkateResults.com

1960 births
Living people
German female speed skaters
Speed skaters at the 1976 Winter Olympics
Speed skaters at the 1980 Winter Olympics
Speed skaters at the 1984 Winter Olympics
Speed skaters at the 1988 Winter Olympics
Olympic speed skaters of East Germany
Medalists at the 1976 Winter Olympics
Medalists at the 1984 Winter Olympics
Medalists at the 1988 Winter Olympics
Olympic medalists in speed skating
Olympic gold medalists for East Germany
Olympic silver medalists for East Germany
Olympic bronze medalists for East Germany
World record setters in speed skating
Sportspeople from Dresden
World Allround Speed Skating Championships medalists